The Mysterious Rider is a 1921 American silent Western film directed by Benjamin B. Hampton and starring Robert McKim, Claire Adams and Carl Gantvoort.

Cast
 Robert McKim as 'Hell-Bent' Wade
 Claire Adams as Columbine
 Carl Gantvoort as Wilson Moore
 Jim Mason a Jack Bellounds 
 Walt Whitman as Bellounds
 Fred Starr as Ed Smith
 Maude Wayne as Madge Smith
 Frank Hayes as 'Smokey Joe' Lem Billings
 Aggie Herring as Ranch Cook Maria

References

Bibliography
 Munden, Kenneth White. The American Film Institute Catalog of Motion Pictures Produced in the United States, Part 1. University of California Press, 1997.

External links
 

1921 films
1921 Western (genre) films
Films directed by Benjamin B. Hampton
Films distributed by W. W. Hodkinson Corporation
Silent American Western (genre) films
1920s English-language films
1920s American films